The men's tournament in volleyball at the 2016 Summer Olympics was the 14th edition of the event at the Summer Olympics, organised by the world's governing body, the FIVB, in conjunction with the IOC. It was held in Rio de Janeiro, Brazil from 7 to 21 August 2016. 

Brazil won the gold medal after a 3–0 win over Italy. The United States defeated Russia 3–2 to win the bronze medal.

The medals for the competition were presented by Shamil Tarpishchev, Russia; Habu Gumel, Nigeria; and Bernard Rajzman, Brazil; Members of the International Olympic Committee and Carlos Arthur Nuzman, Honorary member of the International Olympic Committee and President of the Organizing Committee of the Olympic and Paralympic Games Rio 2016, and the gifts were presented by Ary Graça, Dr. Rafael Lloreda Currea and Dr. Amr Elwani, President and Executive Vice-Presidents of the FIVB.

Competition schedule

Qualification

Format
The preliminary round was a competition between the twelve teams, who were divided into two pools of six teams. This round, the teams competed in a single round-robin format. The four highest ranked teams in each pool advanced to the knockout stage (quarterfinals). The sixth placed teams in each pool were ranked eleventh in this competition. The fifth placed teams in each pool were ranked ninth.

The knockout stage followed the single-elimination format. The losers of the quarterfinals were eliminated and ranked fifth. The quarterfinal winners played in the semifinals. The winners of the semifinals competed for gold medal and the losers played for bronze medal.

Pools composition
Teams were seeded following the serpentine system according to their FIVB World Ranking as of October 2015. FIVB reserved the right to seed the hosts as head of pool A regardless of the World Ranking. Rankings are shown in brackets except the hosts who ranked 1st. The pools were confirmed on 6 June 2016.

Rosters

Venue

Pool standing procedure
In order to establish the ranking of teams after the group stage, the following criteria should be implemented:

 Number of matches won
 Match points
 Sets ratio
 Points ratio
 Result of the last match between the tied teams

Match won 3–0 or 3–1: 3 match points for the winner, 0 match points for the loser
Match won 3–2: 2 match points for the winner, 1 match point for the loser

Referees
The following referees were selected for the tournament.

 Hernán Casamiquela
 Arturo Di Giacomo
 Rogerio Espicalsky
 Paulo Turci
 Liu Jiang
 Denny Cespedes
 Nasr Shaaban
 Heike Kraft
 Mohammad Shahmiri
 Fabrizio Pasquali
 Luis Macias
 Piotr Dudek
 Ibrahim Al-Naama
 Andrey Zenovich
 Vladimir Simonović
 Juraj Mokrý
 Kang Joo-hee
 Susana Rodríguez
 Taoufik Boudaya
 Patricia Rolf

Preliminary round
All times are Brasília Time (UTC−03:00).
The top four teams in each pool qualified for the quarterfinals.

Pool A

Pool B

Knockout stage
All times are Brasília Time (UTC−03:00).
The first ranked teams of both pools played against the fourth ranked teams of the other pool. The second ranked teams faced the second or third ranked teams of the other pool, determined by drawing of lots. The drawing of lots was held after the last match in the preliminary round.

Bracket

Quarterfinals

Semifinals

Bronze medal match

Gold medal match

Final standing

Medalists

Awards

Most Valuable Player
 Sérgio Santos
Best Setter
 Bruno Rezende
Best Outside Spikers
 Aaron Russell
 Ricardo Lucarelli

Best Middle Blockers
 Artem Volvich
 Emanuele Birarelli
Best Opposite Spiker
 Wallace de Souza
Best Libero
 Sérgio Santos

Statistics leaders
Only players whose teams advanced to the semifinals were ranked.

Best Scorers

Best Spikers

Best Blockers

Best Servers

Best Diggers

Best Setters

Best Receivers

Source: FIVB.com

See also
Volleyball at the 2016 Summer Olympics – Women's tournament

References

External links
Official website
Final Standing
Awards
Results at Todor66.com

Volleyball at the 2016 Summer Olympics
Men's events at the 2016 Summer Olympics